Maksymenko or Maksimenko is a Ukrainian-language surname derived form the first name Maksym (Maxim).

The surname may refer to:

Alina Maksymenko (born 1991), Ukrainian gymnast
Igor Maksymenko (born 1984), Ukrainian martial artist
Maksym Maksymenko (born 1990), Ukrainian footballer
Serhiy Maksymenko (born 1941), Ukrainian psychologist
Vitālijs Maksimenko (born 1990), Latvian footballer

See also
 
 

Ukrainian-language surnames
Patronymic surnames
Surnames from given names